Chendebji Chorten is a stupa in Bhutan, located  west of Trongsa at  in elevation.

According to legend, Chendebji Chöten covers the body of an "evil spirit".

Chendebji Chorten is constructed in the style of Nepalese stupas such as Boudhanath. It was built at some point in the 18th century, and is located along the Chorten Lam, a path connecting various chortens in Bhutan. A prayer wall or mani stone is located in the complex.

It was constructed by Lam Oensey Tshering Wangchuk, reportedly to repel the demon Ngala.

A festival is held there annually from the 21st to the 25th day of the 9th lunar month of the Bhutanese calendar.

See also
 Chorten Kora, another Nepalese-style chorten in Bhutan

Notes

Sources 
 

Stupas in Bhutan